Arrow Rock Festival was a rock festival that took place on a yearly basis since 2003 in the Netherlands.  This festival presented mostly classic rock bands. The original location for the festival was Lichtenvoorde; until 2007 when the venue changed to Biddinghuizen. 2008 saw another location change, this time to Goffertpark, Nijmegen . In 2009 the festival was cancelled, because of difficulties with the line-up. In 2010 the festival was cancelled because Aerosmith organised their own event in Goffertpark.

2003
On 27 June 2003 was the first edition of the Arrow Rock Festival. The line-up was:
Deep Purple
Lynyrd Skynyrd
Status Quo
Uriah Heep
L.A. Doors
Wishbone Ash
Manfred Mann's Earth Band
Budgie
Y&T
Thin Lizzy

2004
2004's line-up (after the performances of Anouk & David Bowie were moved to the Amsterdam Arena and White Lion, Herbert Grönemeyer & Porcupine Tree cancelled):
Alice Cooper
Paul Rodgers
Blaze of Glory
Blue Öyster Cult
Brothers in Arms
Caravan
Eric Burdon & The Animals
Fish
G3 feat. Joe Satriani, Steve Vai & Robert Fripp
Golden Earring
Heart
Iron Butterfly
Judas Priest
Montrose
Motörhead
Plaeto
Queensrÿche
Saga
Scorpions
Symphony X
Ten Years After
The Godz
The Quill
UFO
Y&T
Yes

2005
On 11 June the 2005 edition took place, with:
Little River Band
Styx
Kansas
Crosby, Stills & Nash
Meat Loaf
Thunder
Glenn Hughes
Survivor
Lou Gramm
Dream Theater

2006
Pré Party Thursday 8 June:

Rock Palace:
19.00 - 19.50: SQY Rockin' Team
20.10 - 21.10: Clearwater
21.30 - 22.30: Wishbone Ash
23.00 - 00.00: Bintangs

Friday 9 June:

Rock Palace:
14.30 - 15.30: John Waite
16.30 - 17.30: Uriah Heep
18.45 - 19.45: George Thorogood & The Destroyers
21.15 - 22.30: Journey

Rock Garden:
13.30 - 14.30: Blackfoot
15.30 - 16.30: Ted Nugent
17.30 - 18.45: Whitesnake
19.45 - 21.15: Status Quo
22.30 - 00.00: Deep Purple

Saturday 10 June:

Rock Palace:
14.00 - 15.00: Riverside
16.00 - 17.00: Pavlov's Dog
18.00 - 19.00: Dio
20.00 - 21.15: Queensrÿche

Rock Garden:
15.00 - 16.00: Porcupine Tree
17.00 - 18.00: Ray Davies
19.00 - 20.00: Def Leppard
21.15 - 00.15: Roger Waters

Roger Waters gave a 3-hour show with quadraphonic sound. The first half he played songs from Pink Floyd and his solo albums, the second half he performed the complete Pink Floyd album The Dark Side of the Moon.

2007
Friday 30 June:

Rock Garden:
21.15 - 22.45: Aerosmith
19.05 - 20.30: Toto
17.00 - 18.15: Riders On The Storm
15.15 - 16.30: Scorpions
13.30 - 14.30: INXS

Rock Palace: 
18.45 - 20.15  The Australian Pink Floyd Show
16.30 - 18.00  Steve Vai
14.30 - 15.45  Thin Lizzy
13.00 - 14.00  Tesla

Open Airrow Rockstage:
17.30 - 19.00  Europe
16.00 - 17.00  Roger Hodgson
14.15 - 15.15  Outlaws

2008

Sunday 15 June Goffertpark, Nijmegen

Rock Garden

20.45 - 22.45 KISS
18.45 - 19.45 Whitesnake
16.45 - 17.45 Def Leppard
14.45 - 15.45 Journey
12.45 - 13.45 REO Speedwagon

Open Airrow Rock Stage

19.45 - 20.45 Motörhead
17.45 - 18.45 Twisted Sister
15.45 - 16.45 Kansas
13.45 - 14.45 Gotthard

3 Doors Down cancelled but was supposed to play open Arrow Rock Stage after Twisted Sister.

References

External links
Official website

Music festivals in the Netherlands
Rock festivals in the Netherlands
Heavy metal festivals in the Netherlands
Festivals established in 2003
2003 establishments in the Netherlands
Music in Dronten
Music in Nijmegen
Music in Oost Gelre